Donald H. Balch (August 19, 1931 – October 14, 2007) was a brigadier general in the United States Air Force.

Biography
Balch was born on August 19, 1931, in Bellows Falls, Vermont. He later attended the University of Vermont and the New England School of Law and married and had three children. His son, Gareth, also served in the Air Force. Balch was killed in an automobile accident on October 14, 2007, in Bulverde, Texas, and is buried at Arlington National Cemetery.

Career
Balch was commissioned an officer in the Air Force in 1954. In 1961 he entered the Air Force Reserve Command. He served in the Vietnam War and commanded the 512th Military Airlift Wing based at Dover Air Force Base in Dover, Delaware, the 349th Military Airlift Wing based at Travis Air Force Base in Fairfield, California, and the 440th Tactical Airlift Wing based at General Mitchell International Airport in Milwaukee, Wisconsin. Balch retired in 1986.

Awards he received include the Legion of Merit, the Armed Forces Reserve Medal, the National Defense Service Medal, the Vietnam Service Medal, the Outstanding Unit Award, the Air Force Longevity Service Award, the Air Force Training Ribbon, and the Vietnam Gallantry Cross.

References

External links
 

1931 births
2007 deaths
People from Bellows Falls, Vermont
United States Air Force generals
Recipients of the Legion of Merit
Recipients of the Gallantry Cross (Vietnam)
United States Air Force personnel of the Vietnam War
University of Vermont alumni
New England Law Boston alumni
Burials at Arlington National Cemetery
Road incident deaths in Texas
Texas Republicans
People from Bulverde, Texas